A sports spat is a snug fitting outer sleeve that adapts to fit over cleat shoes worn for sports played on artificial turf fields. It pulls up over the shoe and ankle creating a barrier to keep crumb rubber, sand, and other debris that could cause the athlete discomfort and distraction, out of shoes and socks. It also keeps laces tight during game time, replacing the time and cost of taping, known in the sports world as spatting.

References

Body Magazine. March 4, 2011
Team Insight. March 2, 2011
SportsOneSource.com. March 4, 2011

Sports equipment